The Simpang-kanan River is a river in southern Sumatra, Indonesia, about 600 km northwest of the capital Jakarta. It is a tributary of the Rawas River.

Hydrology 
The Simpang-kanan River rises up on Mount Bujang (1951 meter), converging with the Simpang-kiri River, which springs from Lumut Hill (1500 meter), northwest of Hulu Simpang Kiri Hill (1003 meter) and changing name into the Rawas River, a tributary of the Musi River.

Geography
The river flows in the southern area of Sumatra with predominantly tropical rainforest climate (designated as Af in the Köppen–Geiger climate classification). The annual average temperature in the area is 23 °C. The warmest month is October, when the average temperature is around 24 °C, and the coldest is June, at 22 °C. The average annual rainfall is 3546 mm. The wettest month is December, with an average of 482 mm rainfall, and the driest is June, with 115 mm rainfall.

See also
List of rivers of Indonesia
List of rivers of Sumatra

References

Rivers of South Sumatra
Rivers of Indonesia